The George IV State Diadem, officially the Diamond Diadem, is a crown that was made in 1820 for King George IV. The diadem is worn by queens regnant and queens consort in procession to coronations and State Openings of Parliament. It has been featured in paintings and on stamps and currency.

Origin
George IV commissioned Rundell & Bridge to make the diadem in 1820 at a cost of £8,216. The fee included a hire charge of £800 for the diamonds but there is no evidence they were ever returned to the jewellers. George IV wore the diadem over his velvet cap of maintenance in the procession to his coronation at Westminster Abbey.

Description

Along the base are two strings of pearls. Originally, the upper string had 86 pearls and the lower 94, but they were changed to 81 and 88 in 1902. Instead of the heraldic fleurs-de-lis usually seen on British crowns, the diadem has four bouquets of roses, thistles and shamrocks, the floral symbols of England, Scotland and Ireland respectively, alternating with four crosses pattée around the top of its base.

Use
It has been worn by every queen regnant and queen consort from Queen Adelaide, the wife of William IV, onwards. The diadem may have been reset with jewels from the royal collection for Queen Victoria, although the Royal Collection Trust suggests the original 1820 stones were discreetly purchased from Rundell Bridge and Rundell, and remain in situ. Queen Elizabeth II wore the diadem in the procession to her coronation in 1953, and she also wore it in the procession to and from the annual State Opening of Parliament.

In art, stamps, and currency

The iconic piece of jewellery has featured in many portraits of Queen Elizabeth II, including one painted by Lucian Freud in 2001 and one by Raphael Maklouf in 1984 that appears on Commonwealth coinage.

Arnold Machin designed an earlier portrait in the 1960s that was used on coins and the Machin series of postage stamps in the UK.

The diadem has also featured on the banknotes of most Commonwealth realms, and those of Anguilla, Bermuda, British Guiana, British Honduras, British Virgin Islands, Cyprus, Dominica, Fiji, British Hong Kong, Malaya, Malta, Mauritius, British North Borneo, Rhodesia and Nyasaland, Southern Rhodesia, St Kitts and Nevis and Trinidad and Tobago.

See also
Crown Jewels of the United Kingdom
Coronation Crown of George IV
Elizabeth II's jewels

References

External links

Jewellery of the Royal Collection of the United Kingdom
1820 works
George IV of the United Kingdom
Individual crowns